Tula: The Revolt is a 2013 historical drama film that was directed by Jeroen Leinders. The film tells the life story of the slave Tula (Obi Abili) who lead the Slave Revolt of 1795 on Curaçao in the Dutch West Indies. The film premiered on 4 July 2013 in the Netherlands.

Cast
 Obi Abili as Tula
 Danny Glover as Shinishi
 Jeroen Krabbé as Gouvernor De Veer
 Deobia Oparei as Hacha
 Paul Bazely as Louis
 Derek de Lint as Baron Van Westerholt
 Aden Gillett as Father Schinck
 Jeroen Willems as Van Uytrecht
 Doña Croll as Old Mama Pretu

Awards 
 Grand Jury Prize (2013) at the London Film Awards
 Best Film (2014) at the San Diego Black Film Festival
 Best Lead Actor (2014) at the San Diego Black Film Festival

See also
 List of films featuring slavery

References

External links 
 
 
 

2013 biographical drama films
2010s historical drama films
2013 films
Films about slavery
Films set in the Caribbean
Films set in 1795
2013 drama films